The Tennessee Court of Appeals (in case citation, Tenn. Ct. App.) was created in 1925 by the Tennessee General Assembly as an intermediate appellate court to hear appeals in civil cases from the Tennessee state trial courts. Appeals of judgments made by the Court of Appeals may be made to the Tennessee Supreme Court.

Judges
The Court has twelve judges who sit on three-judge panels in Jackson, Knoxville, and Nashville.  Judges are chosen via the Tennessee Plan:  they are elected every eight years, and must be evaluated prior to the election in order to keep voters informed.  If a vacancy occurs between election cycles (for example, if a judge dies or retires), the 17-member Tennessee Judicial Selection Commission interviews applicants and recommends three candidates to the governor.  The governor then appoints a new judge to serve in the interim period until the next August general election.

The twelve judges sitting on the Court  are:

Kenny Armstrong – Western Section
Andy D. Bennett – Middle Section
Frank G. Clement, Jr. – Middle Section
Richard H. Dinkins – Middle Section
Thomas R. Frierson, II – Eastern Section
Carma Dennis McGee – Western Section
Arnold B. Goldin – Western Section
W. Neal McBrayer – Middle Section
John Westley McClarty – Eastern Section
J. Steven Stafford – Western Section
Charles D. Susano, Jr. – Eastern Section
D. Michael Swiney – Eastern Section

References

External links
Homepage of the Tennessee Court of Appeals
Description of the Court from the Tennessee Blue Book

Tennessee state courts
State appellate courts of the United States
1925 establishments in Tennessee
Courts and tribunals established in 1925